Fred Morris (15 June 1929 – 20 November 1998) was a professional footballer who played as a winger. He played in the Football League for six clubs.

Playing career
Morris was born in Oswestry and began his playing career with non-league Oswestry Town before joining Walsall in May 1950. He made more than 200 league appearances for the Walsall before moving to Mansfield Town in March 1957 for £1,500. In May 1958, Morris moved again, joining the Division Two side Liverpool for £7,000.

Morris was initially a regular at Anfield but he played in just one match after the arrival of Bill Shankly as manager in December 1959. He spent the 1960–61 season with Crewe Alexandra and then Gillingham. He joined Chester in July 1961, playing more than half the games as the side finished bottom of the Football League. At the end of the season he was released by the manager, Bill Lambton, and he joined Altrincham. This was followed by a return to Oswestry Town, where he became manager in two spells (1969-73 and 1980-83).

Away from football, Morris ran a building contractor's business and took over a garage in Oswestry.

References

External links
Player profile at LFChistory.net
Article on players to play for Chester and Liverpool

1929 births
1998 deaths
English footballers
Sportspeople from Oswestry
Association football wingers
English Football League players
Oswestry Town F.C. players
Walsall F.C. players
Mansfield Town F.C. players
Liverpool F.C. players
Crewe Alexandra F.C. players
Gillingham F.C. players
Chester City F.C. players
Altrincham F.C. players
English football managers
Oswestry Town F.C. managers